Pracheta Gupta (alternative spelling Procheto Gupta or Prachet Gupta or Procheta Gupta) (born 14 October 1962) is a Bengali writer and journalist. In 2007, his work Chander Bari has been adapted into a Bengali film by director Tarun Majumdar. In 2011, director Sekhar Das made film on Gupta's story Chor-er bou ("Wife of a thief"), the film was named Necklace. Few of his stories have been translated into Hindi, Oriya and Marathi language.

In December 2022, Gupta was felicitated with Sera Bangali Award by ABP Ananda.

Early life
Recipient of Kishore Sahitya Academy Award, 2021, Gupta spent his childhood in Bangur Avenue and studied in Bangur Boys school. He started writing from his childhood. His first story was published in Anandamela when he was only 12 years old. Later his literary works were published in many more magazines.  He completed his graduation from Scottish Church College, Kolkata with Economics Honours under the University of Calcutta.

Literary works
Gupta's first novel Aamar ja achhe was published in 2004 in Anandalok magazine. His first children's novel  Laal rong-er churi was published in the same year in Anandamela.

Bibliography

Aamar Ja Achhe (Dey's Publishing-2004)
Aschorjo Pukur(Mitra O Ghosh-2007) 
Deri Hoye Gechhe(Patra Bharati-2010)
Dekha Habe (Deep Prakasan-2015)Jhildangar Konya(Mitra O Ghosh-2009)Jole Aanka(Mita O Ghosh-2005)Jabajjiban(Ananda Publishers-2011)Kothao Noy(Dey's Publishing-2009)Kanchangorer Kokil Sir(Ananda Publishers-2009)Kalyanpurer Kando (Dey's Publishing)-2012)Nil Alor Phul(Ananda Publishers-2005)Ponchashti Golpo (Ananda Publishers-2010)Pracheta Guptar Galpo(Mitra O Ghosh-2011)Rajkanya(Dey's Publishing-2010)Ranipurer Kapurush (Ananda Publishers)Rupor Khacha(Ananda Publishers-2008)Shunyo Kham(Patra Bharati-2010)Shit Khub Dure Noy(Ananda Publishers-2010)Teen Number Chithi(Dey's Publishing-2009)Operation Singhaduar(Ananda Publishers-2013)Jadabbabu Mithya Bolen Na(Ananda Publishers-2013)Chupi Chupi Bolchhi (Mitra O Ghosh-2015)Chand Pore Achhe (Patra Bharati-(2013)Chhade Ke Haatey (Patra Bharati-2015)Ek Je Chhilo Sagar (Mitra O Ghosh) (2014)Shey Irabati (Abhijaan Publishers-2014)Shahid Bhupati Sen Colony (Ananda Publishers-2015) Raate Porben Na (Mitra O Ghosh) 2014
 Chiro Sakha (National Book Trust) 2010
 Kalyanpurer Kando (Dey's Publishing) 2012
 Ej Kathuria Aar Bagher Galpo (2015) (National Book Trust India)Ami Ekjan Meye (Mitra 0 Ghosh) 2016 Sagar Hoite Sabdhan (Abhijanh Publishers) 2016 Swapner Charai (Ananda Publishers) 2016
  Ektu Pore Rode Uthbe (Patra Bharati) 2017
 Malat Khulle Bipad (Mitra -O- Ghosh) 2017
  Mukto Abaron e (Ananda Publishers 2017)
 Hatyakander Aage O Pare (Ananda Publishers) (2018)
 Ferat Asha Galpo (Dey's Publishing_(2018)
 Doshi Dhara Parbe (Patra Bharati) (2018)
 Megh Mallare Baaje Hatyar Gaan (Patra Bharati) 2019
 Diner Belateo Bhoot Dyakha Jaaye (Patra Bharati 2019
Anabrityo (aBHIJAN) (2019)
  Nuri Patherer Dinguli (Ananda Publishers) 2019
  DHulo Baalir Jeeban (Ananda Publishers) 2019
  Bachhai Kawra Bhoy (Mitra-O-Ghosh) 2019
Ei Galpota Na Bollei Bhalo Hoto (Mita-O-Ghosh) 2019
 Sagarer Shwab Aachhe (Mitra -O-Ghosh) 2019
 Bachhai Kora Prem (Mitra-O-Ghosh) 2019
 Maatir Deyal (Ananda Publishers) 2019
 Gopan Baksho Khulte Nei' (Patra Bharati) (2018)
 Sir Aami Khun Korechhi (Mitra-O Ghosh) (2020)
Kabio Chhilen Joddha (Essays)(Dey's Publishing) (2021)
 Nishaad (Ananda Publishers) 2021
 Aagun barir katha *Dey's Publishing) 2021Akapat Pracheta (Daarabar Jayega) 2023Kichhu Phool, Kichhu Astra (2023)
Bacchai Kawra Hashi (mitra O Ghosh) 2023
Ekti Sankhipta Hatya Rahasya (2023)Eshawb Thik Hochchhe Na (2023)
 Films based on his works
Chander Bari (2007)
Necklace (2011) 
Balukabela.com (2012) 
 Bhalobashar Bari (2018)

Awards 
BAAL SAHITYA ACADEMY -2021
BANGLA ACADEMY, SUTAPA ROY CHOWDHURY)
INTERNATIONAL KOLKATA BOOK FAIR AWARD
BIBHUTIBHUSHAN SMRITI PURASHKAR AWARD
RAMMOHAN LIBRARY SAHITYA SAMMAN
SHAILAJANANDA SMIRITI PURASHKAR
PRATHAM AALO SAMMAN
GAJENDRANATH MITRA O SUMATHANATH GHOSH SMRITI PURASKAR
MATI NANDI SMRITI PURASKAR 
AKASH TV SAHITYA SAMMAN
DINESH CHANDRA CHATTOPADHYAY SMRITI PURASKAR

Notes

References 

 Writers from Kolkata

External links

Living people
Bengali novelists
Bengali-language writers
1962 births
Scottish Church College alumni
University of Calcutta alumni